Lionel Edmond Kochan (20 August 1922 – 25 September 2005) was a British historian, journalist and publisher. He is best known for his work in Jewish history, having become an academic historian in his 30s and formerly specialising in European history.

Background 
Kochan was a doctoral student of Sir Charles Webster. Before moving into academia, he worked as a publisher and journalist.

Career 
His first academic post was as a lecturer in European history at the University of Edinburgh from 1959 to 1964. He then moved to the University of East Anglia, where he was Reader in European History from 1965 to 1969. He was Bearsted Reader in Jewish History at University of Warwick from 1969 until his retirement in 1987.

Kochan was born in London into a secular Jewish family. His scholarly writing became increasingly concerned with Jewish history. In the 1970s onwards, he became more involved in his Jewish heritage. His wife Miriam Kochlan (c.1935-2023) was a writer and translator and she popularised the ceremony of batmitzvah for girls aged 12 in Oxford.

Selected works
 Acton on History (1954)
 Russia and the Weimar Republic (1954)
 Pogrom: 10 November 1938 (1957)
 The Making of Modern Russia (1962)
 The Struggle for Germany 1914–45 (1963)
 Russia in Revolution 1890–1918 (1966)
 The Jews in Soviet Russia since 1917 (1970) editor
 The Russian Revolution (1970)
 The Jewish Family Album: The Life of a People in Photographs (1974) editor with Miriam Kochan
 The Jew and His History (1977)
 The Scapegoats: the Exodus of the Remnants of Polish Jewry (1979) with Josef Banas
 Jews, Idols and Messiahs: The Challenge from History (1990)
 The Jewish Renaissance and Some of Its Discontents (1992)
 Beyond the Graven Image: A Jewish View (1997)
 The Making of Western Jewry, 1600–1819 (2004)

References

External links
 Guardian obituary
 Times obituary

1922 births
2005 deaths
Deaths from leukemia
People educated at Haberdashers' Boys' School
English Jews
Writers from London
Academics of the University of Warwick
20th-century British historians
Deaths from cancer in the United Kingdom